La Chienne is a 1931 French film by director Jean Renoir. It is the second sound film by the director and the twelfth film of his career. The film is based on the eponymous story "La Chienne" by Georges de La Fouchardière. The literal English translation of the film's title is "The Bitch", although the movie was never released under this title. It is often referred to in English as Isn't Life a Bitch? The film was remade by Fritz Lang in the United States as Scarlet Street (1945).

La Chienne was released by The Criterion Collection on both Blu-ray and DVD, newly restored in 4K, on 14 June 2016.

Plot
Maurice Legrand (Michel Simon), a meek cashier and aspirant painter, is miserably married to Adèle, an abusive woman who mistreats him. After a celebration in the company where he works, Maurice stumbles upon a man called André "Dédé" Jauguin (Georges Flamant) hitting a young woman called Lucienne "Lulu" Pelletier (Janie Marèse) on the street. Maurice protects Lulu and brings her home. Lulu, who is a prostitute, tells the naive Maurice that Dédé is her brother, but Dédé is actually her pimp. Maurice rents an apartment for Lulu and she becomes his mistress. Soon he brings his paintings to the apartment, since his wife Adèle intends to throw them away. But Dédé sells the paintings to an art dealer for a large amount, telling the dealer that Lulu had painted them using the alias Clara Wood. When Maurice stumbles upon Adèle's former husband who was supposedly killed in the War, he plots a scheme to get rid of Adèle. He succeeds in his intent, only to discover Lulu and Dédé in bed during the night. Shocked, he leaves, but returns in the morning to talk to Lulu. She confesses that she loves Dédé and humiliates Maurice, saying that the only reason she stayed with him was his money. Maurice attacks her with a knife and leaves the apartment with no witnesses. Dédé arrives moments later and discovers Lulu's body. Dédé is blamed for Lulu's death owing to his reputation, and he is executed. Maurice becomes a vagrant.

Cast (in credits order)
 Michel Simon as Maurice Legrand
 Janie Marèse as Lucienne 'Lulu' Pelletier
 Georges Flamant as André 'Dédé' Jauguin
 Magdeleine Bérubet as Adèle Legrand
 Roger Gaillard as Sergeant Alexis Godard
 Jean Gehret as Dugodet
 Alexandre Rignault as Langelarde
 Lucien Mancini as Wallstein
 Marcel Courmes as Colonel
 Max Dalban as Bernard
 Henri Guisol as Amédée
 Romain Bouquet as Henriot
 Pierre Desty as Gustave
 Jane Pierson as the Concierge
 Christian Argentin as Examining judge
 Sylvain Itkine as Dédé's lawyer
 Colette Borelli as Lily
 Marthe Doryans as Yvonne

Production and aftermath
In the film Michel Simon falls in love with Janie Marèse, and he did off-screen as well, while Marèse fell for Georges Flamant, who plays the pimp. Renoir and producer Pierre Braunberger had encouraged the relationship between Flamant and Marèse in order to get the fullest conviction into their performances (La Chienne was Flamant's first acting experience). After the film  had been completed Flamant, who could barely drive, took Marèse for a drive, crashed the car and she was killed. At the funeral Michel Simon fainted and had to be supported as he walked past the grave. He threatened Renoir with a gun, saying that the death of Marèse was all his fault. "Kill me if you like", responded Renoir, "but I have made the film".

Home media
On 23 October 2003 La Chienne was released on DVD in France by Opening Distribution, along with Renoir's On purge bébé (1931), Tire-au-flanc (1928), and Catherine (1924), as part of a box set. The film was later released together with Renoir's Partie de campagne (A Day in the Country) by M6 Vidéo on both Blu-ray and DVD in France on 10 November 2015.

La Chienne was released in North America on LaserDisc in 1989 by Image Entertainment as part of the "CinemaDisc Collection". The film was also released on VHS by Kino International on 5 February 2002, which includes Partie de campagne as an extra. On 14 June 2016 American video-distribution company The Criterion Collection released La Chienne, newly restored through a 4K digital transfer, on Blu-ray and DVD. Both editions include a 1961 introduction to the film by director Jean Renoir, a new interview with a Renoir scholar, a new restoration of Renoir's On purge bébé, a 95-minute conversation between Renoir and actor Michel Simon directed by Jacques Rivette, new English subtitles for the film, and an essay by film scholar Ginette Vincendeau. The new Blu-ray and DVD cover as well as interior poster was illustrated by Blutch.

References

External links
 
 
 
 
 La Chienne: He, She, and the Other Guy an essay by Ginette Vincendeau at the Criterion Collection

1931 films
1931 drama films
French drama films
1930s French-language films
French black-and-white films
Films set in Paris
Films directed by Jean Renoir
Films based on adaptations
Films based on French novels
French films based on plays
Films about prostitution in Paris
1930s French films